A Blessing in Disguise is the third full-length studio album of the Norwegian progressive metal band, Green Carnation. The album was released two years after their previous album, Light of Day, Day of Darkness.

Background 
This album was a stylistic shift for the band, creating some more "live-friendly" rock songs as opposed to its sixty-minute-long predecessor.

Track listing

Personnel 
Green Carnation
 Kjetil Nordhus – vocals
 Bjørn Harstad – lead guitar and guitar effects
 Terje Vik Schei (a.k.a. Tchort) – guitar
 Stein Roger Sordal – bass, guitars, and harp
 Bernt A. Moen – keyboards and piano
 Anders Kobro – drums

Guest musicians
 Christiansand Chamber Ensemble

References

Green Carnation albums
2003 albums
Season of Mist albums